Mr Frisk (c.1979 – September 2000) was a Thoroughbred racehorse, famous for his victory in the 1990 Grand National. He completed the course in record time of 8 minutes and 47.80 seconds, ridden by Marcus Armytage; this still stands, even though the race has been  shorter since 2013. The pair also went on to win the Whitbread Gold Cup three weeks later - the only horse to achieve the double. The second placed horse in the National, Durham Edition, also filled the second place at Sandown.

After retirement from racing he continued as an eventer, trained by Tracey Bailey.

He was put down in September 2000 after fracturing a hind leg.

Grand National record

References

2000 racehorse deaths
Racehorses bred in the United Kingdom
Racehorses trained in the United Kingdom
Grand National winners
Thoroughbred family 23
National Hunt racehorses